The 2018 Presbyterian Blue Hose women's soccer team represents Presbyterian College during the 2018 NCAA Division I women's soccer season. This season is the 30th in program history. The Blue Hose play their home games at Martin Stadium in Clinton.

Previous season
In 2017, the Blue Hose finished the season 3–13, 1–8 in Big South play.

Roster

Schedule

|-
!colspan=8 style=""| Non-conference regular season

|-
!colspan=8 style=""| Big South regular season

References

2018 in sports in South Carolina
Presbyterian Blue Hose women's soccer seasons
2018 Big South Conference women's soccer season